Brian N. Sheth is the former President of Vista Equity Partners, a private equity fund based in Austin, Texas. Sheth was listed in the Forbes 2018 World Billionaires list with an estimated net worth of $2 billion. He was also a member of Fortune’s 2015 “40 under 40” list and Forbes’ 40 under 40 in 2015. In 2020, Forbes ranked him No. 359 in the Forbes 400 list of the richest people in America.

Early life
His father was an immigrant from India who worked in finance and marketing, and his Irish-Catholic mother worked as an insurance analyst.

Education and early career
Sheth holds a B.S. in Economics from the Wharton School of the University of Pennsylvania.

He worked in the mergers and acquisitions groups at Goldman Sachs and Deutsche Morgan Grenfell, where he advised clients in a variety of industries, including software, hardware, semiconductors, and online media.

Sheth then worked at Bain Capital, where he focused on leveraged buyouts of technology companies.

Vista Equity Partners
In 2000, Sheth joined Vista Equity Partners as vice president. Vista is an investment firm that owns over 50 software companies and has 65,000 employees worldwide, making it the fourth largest enterprise software company after Microsoft, Oracle, and SAP. Vista was named the world’s top-performing private equity firm by the 2014 HEC-Dow Jones Private Equity Performance Ranking. In 2010, Sheth became president of the company and was given the title of co-founder. In November 2020, Sheth resigned from Vista.

Boards and philanthropy
Sheth sits on a number of boards, including: The Active Network, Advicent, Aptean, Autotask, Bullhorn, DealerSocket, Global Wildlife Conservation, Greenway, MarVista Entertainment, MRI Software, STATS, Taxware, and Forcepoint.

Sheth and his wife, Adria Sheth, established the Sheth Sangreal Foundation, which is dedicated to education and wildlife conservation. Sheth also chairs the Global Wildlife Conservation, an international organization working in over 50 countries around the world to protect wildlife and ecosystems.

References 

American business executives
American billionaires
Living people
1975 births
American people of Irish descent
American people of Indian descent